Joshua Arap Sang, born in Kitale, Trans-Nzoia District, Kenya, is the current head of Radio Emoo fm and acting head of radio stations at mediamax ltd in Nairobi, Kenya.

ICC Case 
On March 8, 2011, he was indicted by the International Criminal Court for five charges of crimes against humanity committed during the 2007–2008 Kenyan crisis. He was alleged to have committed these crimes against PNU supporters.

An ICC Pre-Trial Chamber summoned him to appear before the court on April 7, 2011, together with William Ruto and Henry Kiprono Kosgey. The ICC charges against Ruto and Sang were dropped in April 2016.

See also
John Kituyi

References 

Living people
Kenyan journalists
People from Trans-Nzoia County
People indicted by the International Criminal Court
Year of birth missing (living people)